Kinga Maria Dunin-Horkawicz (born 1954 in Łódź) is a Polish writer, feminist, and sociologist.

Life 
She is a columnist for the Wysokie Obcasy (women's extra of the Gazeta Wyborcza) and academic teacher at the Medical University of Warsaw. Before 1989 she was active in the democratic opposition (KOR and samizdat among others). Member of the New Left intellectual milieu Krytyka Polityczna and of the Polish Greens 2004.

Books
Sociology
 1991: Cudze problemy. Analiza dyskursu publicznego w Polsce (Others' Problems: an Analysis of Polish Public Discourse; coauthor)
 2004: Czytając Polskę. Literatura polska po roku 1989 wobec dylematów nowoczesności (Reading Poland: Polish post-1989 Literature and the Dilemmas of Modernity)

Feminism
 1996: Tao gospodyni domowej (Tao of a Housewife)
 2000: Karoca z dyni (A Pumpkin Coach) - nomination for Nike Award 2001
 2002: Czego chcecie ode mnie, "Wysokie Obcasy"? (What do you want from me, "Wysokie Obcasy"?)
 2007: Zadyma (A Revolt)

Novels
 1998: Tabu (Taboo)
 1999: Obciach (Embarrassment)

References

External links 
 Polish bibliography 1988 - 2001

1954 births
Living people
Writers from Łódź
The Greens (Poland) politicians
Polish feminists
Polish women writers
Polish atheists